Roland Oswald Johnson (28 October 1906 − 12 February 2002) was a New Zealand athlete, who represented his country in the triple jump at the 1930 British Empire Games in Hamilton, Ontario. He finished in sixth place, with a distance of 13.16 m. He was the father of hurdler and operations management academic Roger Johnson.

Johnson died in Dunedin in 2002 and his ashes were buried at Andersons Bay Cemetery.

References

1906 births
2002 deaths
Athletes from Dunedin
New Zealand male triple jumpers
Commonwealth Games competitors for New Zealand
Athletes (track and field) at the 1930 British Empire Games
Burials at Andersons Bay Cemetery